A posse cut is a popular form of song in hip hop music that involves successive verses by four or more rappers.

Tracks described as posse cuts by Rolling Stone include A Tribe Called Quest's "Scenario", "Tha Shit" by The D.O.C., "Doin' Our Own Dang" by Jungle Brothers, "Monster" and “So Appalled” by Kanye West, and "Set It Off" by Snoop Dogg. Tracks described by Allmusic as posse cuts include "Wu-Gambinos" by Raekwon, "1, 2, 3" by Naughty by Nature, and "Head Banger" by EPMD.

History
Many classic early hip hop tracks, such as Afrika Bambaataa & the Soul Sonic Force's "Zulu Nation Throwdown", took the form of a posse cut. The posse cut became established in the eighties as a way for rappers to give exposure to their friends, or their posse.  However, towards the end of the eighties and the start of the nineties, the posse cut began to be used as an "All-Stars" device to bring together rappers who had respect for each other's skills on the microphone, or a way to unite various well-known and respected artists to deliver an important message.

Notable examples

1980–90s

"The Symphony" by Marley Marl, 1988, featuring Masta Ace, Craig G, Kool G Rap and Big Daddy Kane. Allmusic describes it as "one of the best posse cuts in hip-hop history", and "classic".
"Parental Discretion Iz Advised" by N.W.A, featuring The D.O.C. The only track from the 1988 Straight Outta Compton album to feature verses from all rapping members of N.W.A, and a guest appearance from The D.O.C who also co-wrote several songs on the album.
"We're All in the Same Gang" is a 1990 single by the West Coast Rap All-Stars, a collaboration of West Coast hip-hop artists that assembled for this song that promoted an anti-violence message. Produced by Dr. Dre, the song featured rapped verses from: King Tee, Body & Soul (including Dee Barnes), Def Jef, Michel'le, Tone-Loc, Above The Law, Ice-T, Dr. Dre, MC Ren, Eazy-E of N.W.A, J.J. Fad, Young MC, Digital Underground's Money-B and Shock G/Humpty Hump, Oaktown's 3.5.7 and MC Hammer.
"Live at the Barbeque" by Main Source, featuring Nas, Joe Fatal, Akinyele, and Large Professor, from their 1991 album Breaking Atoms. This song was the debut for Nas, and his verse was later sampled on "Genesis", the intro track to his debut album Illmatic (1994).
"Scenario" by A Tribe Called Quest, 1991, featuring Leaders of the New School. Rolling Stone describes "Scenario" as "the ultimate posse cut", and in Allmusic's review of "Scenario" they say, "not only did Tribe make history on The Low End Theory by putting together one of the best hip-hop albums of all time, they also opened up a hole in the sky for the emergence of the ever-unique and talented genius of Busta Rhymes".
"Cowboys" is a song by The Fugees from their 1996 album The Score. Besides verses from the existing Fugees, the song also features Outsidaz members Pacewon, Rah Digga, Young Zee, and Fugee affiliate John Forté.
"Make 'Em Say Uhh!" and its remix "Make 'Em Say Uhhh! #2" by Master P, from the 1997 album Ghetto D and the 1998 album MP da Last Don respectively. The song features from Fiend, Silkk The Shocker, Mia X and Mystikal. The remix features the same lineup of artists as well as the verse order as the original, with an exception of Mystikal's verse being replaced by a verse from Snoop Dogg.
"Triumph" by the Wu-Tang Clan from the 1997 album Wu-Tang Forever. The song features verses from Inspectah Deck, Method Man, Cappadonna, U-God, RZA, GZA, Masta Killa, Ghostface Killah, and Raekwon with the intro and ad libs from Ol' Dirty Bastard.
 "Banned from T.V." by Noreaga, 1998, featuring Big Pun, Nature, Cam'ron, Jadakiss, and Styles P.
"The Anthem" by Sway & King Tech, 1999, featuring RZA, Eminem, Tech N9ne, Xzibit, Pharoahe Monch, Kool G Rap, Jayo Felony, Chino XL, and KRS-One. The book How to Rap describes it as a "classic posse cut".

2000s–20s
"Candy (Drippin' Like Water)", is a song by Snoop Dogg from his 2006 album Tha Blue Carpet Treatment. This song was produced by Rick Rock and it features verses from Snoop Dogg, E-40, MC Eiht, Goldie Loc, Tha Dogg Pound (Daz Dillinger and Kurupt), and Ladybug Mecca from Digable Planets.
"Its Okay (One Blood MegaMix) by Game, 2006, featuring Jim Jones, Snoop Dogg, Nas, T.I., Fat Joe, Lil Wayne, N.O.R.E., Jadakiss, Styles P, Fabolous, Juelz Santana, Rick Ross, Twista, Tha Dogg Pound (Kurupt & Daz Dillinger), WC, E-40, Bun B, Chamillionaire, Slim Thug, Young Dro, Clipse (Pusha T & No Malice), and Ja Rule. The song begins with "Dre, I See More Dead People". It is 11 minutes and 50 seconds long.
"The Last Huzzah!" by Mr. Muthafuckin' eXquire feat. Despot, Heems, Kool A.D., Danny Brown, and El-P. The track was a remix of Exquire's "Huzzah". The cut was called one of the best songs of 2011 by Rolling Stone Magazine.
"Mercy" by Kanye West, Big Sean, Pusha T and 2 Chainz is a cut from the G.O.O.D. music album Cruel Summer. The track was hailed as the best song of 2012 by many publications, including SPIN Magazine.
"Oldie" by Odd Future, 2012 posse cut from The OF Tape Vol. 2. It features Tyler, the Creator, Hodgy Beats, Left Brain, Mike G, Domo Genesis, Frank Ocean, Jasper Dolphin and Earl Sweatshirt.
"1 Train" by ASAP Rocky featuring Kendrick Lamar, Joey Badass, Yelawolf, Danny Brown, Action Bronson, and Big K.R.I.T., from the 2013 album Long. Live. ASAP.
"Detroit vs. Everybody", 2014 single off Shady Records's compilation album Shady XV, featuring Eminem, DeJ Loaf, Royce Da 5'9, Big Sean, Danny Brown and Trick Trick.
"Really Doe" by Danny Brown, posse cut featuring Kendrick Lamar, Ab-Soul and Earl Sweatshirt. Released as a single for his 2016 album Atrocity Exhibition.
"RAF" by ASAP Mob, from their 2017 album Cozy Tapes Vol. 2: Too Cozy. It features ASAP Rocky, Playboi Carti, Quavo, Lil Uzi Vert, and Frank Ocean.
"Rolling 110 Deep" by DJ Kay Slay, from his 2021 mixtape Accolades. This song was produced by Trackateering Music. Features  Sheek Louch, Styles P, Dave East, Crooked I, Black Thought, Conway the Machine, Raekwon, Ghostface Killah, Inspectah Deck, Papoose, Loaded Lux, AZ, Bun B, Fred the Godson, Jim Jones, Ransom, Rah Digga, M.O.P., Trae The Truth, Joell Ortiz, Lord Tariq and Peter Gunz, Cory Gunz, Shaq Diesel, Roy Jones Jr., Kool DJ Red Alert, Redman, Young Buck, MC Serch, Big Daddy Kane, MC Shan, KRS-One, Jon Connor, Twista, Drag-On, Chris Rivers, Nino Man, Locksmith, 3D Na'Tee, Trick-Trick, Tragedy Khadafi, E-A-Ski, Cassidy, Freddie Foxxx, Gillie da Kid, Ice-T, Treach, Kool G Rap, Lil Cease, RJ Payne, J.R. Writer, Shoota 93, Ms. Hustle, Vado, Mysonne, Mistah F.A.B., Saigon, Melle Mel, Grandmaster Caz, Havoc, Tracey Lee, Outlawz, Herb Gruff And Spit, Sickflo, Onyx, Ras Kass, Termanology, DJ Doowop, Junior Reid, Oun P, Merkules, Wais P, Maino, Uncle Murda, PT Capone Mobstyle, Mike Cee, Royal Flush, Super Lover Cee, Page Kennedy, Rock, Gunplay, Brand Nubian, Sonja Blade, Coke La Rock, Nice & Smooth, Consequence, Millyz, OT The Real, Ron Artest, Kaflow, Tone Trump, Hocus 45th, Omar Epps, Bodega Bamz, Bynoe, Ptkny, Aobie, Sporty Thievz, Tony Moxberg, Styleon, Chuck D, Sauce Money.
"Strangers" by Danger Mouse and Black Thought on their collaborative 2022 album Cheat Codes. Features ASAP Rocky, El-P and Killer Mike with the latter two billed together as Run the Jewels.

References

External links
 Top 5 Posse Cuts of All Time by Angus Crawford

Rapping
 
 
Song forms